The 2013–14 season will be Mezőkövesd SE's 1st competitive season, 1st consecutive season in the OTP Bank Liga and 38th year in existence as a football club.

First team squad

Transfers

Summer

In:

Out:

Winter

In:

Out:

List of Hungarian football transfers summer 2013
List of Hungarian football transfers winter 2013–14

Statistics

Appearances and goals
Last updated on 1 June 2014.

|-
|colspan="14"|Youth players:
|-
|colspan="14"|Out to loan:

|-
|colspan="14"|Players no longer at the club:

|}

Top scorers
Includes all competitive matches. The list is sorted by shirt number when total goals are equal.

Last updated on 1 June 2014

Disciplinary record
Includes all competitive matches. Players with 1 card or more included only.

Last updated on 1 June 2014

Overall
{|class="wikitable"
|-
|Games played || 42 (30 OTP Bank Liga, 4 Hungarian Cup and 8 Hungarian League Cup)
|-
|Games won || 13 (6 OTP Bank Liga, 3 Hungarian Cup and 4 Hungarian League Cup)
|-
|Games drawn || 7 (6 OTP Bank Liga, 0 Hungarian Cup and 1 Hungarian League Cup)
|-
|Games lost || 22 (18 OTP Bank Liga, 1 Hungarian Cup and 3 Hungarian League Cup)
|-
|Goals scored || 57
|-
|Goals conceded || 71
|-
|Goal difference || -14
|-
|Yellow cards || 99
|-
|Red cards || 8
|-
|rowspan="3"|Worst discipline ||  Zoltán Harsányi (8 , 1 )
|-
|  Dominik Fótyik (8 , 1 )
|-
|  Vilmos Szalai (10 , 0 )
|-
|rowspan="1"|Best result || 7–1 (A) v Balmazújváros – Ligakupa – 20-11-2013
|-
|rowspan="3"|Worst result || 1–6 (A) v Újpest – OTP Bank Liga – 24-08-2013
|-
| 0–5 (A) v Diósgyőr – OTP Bank Liga – 05-10-2013
|-
| 0–5 (A) v Győr – OTP Bank Liga – 31-05-2014
|-
|rowspan="1"|Most appearances ||  George Menougong (37 appearances)
|-
|rowspan="2"|Top scorer ||  Zoltán Harsányi (8 goals)
|-
|  Ádám Balajti (8 goals)
|-
|Points || 46/126 (36.51%)
|-

Nemzeti Bajnokság I

Matches

Classification

Results summary

Results by round

Hungarian Cup

League Cup

Group stage

Classification

Knockout phase

Pre-season

References

External links
 Eufo
 Official Website
 fixtures and results

Mezőkövesdi SE seasons
Mezokovesd se